The 18th Legislative Assembly of Ontario was in session from October 30, 1929, until May 16, 1934, just prior to the 1934 general election. The majority party was the Ontario Conservative Party led by George Howard Ferguson.

George Stewart Henry replaced Ferguson as party leader and Premier in December 1930 after Ferguson was named Canadian High Commissioner in London.

Thomas Ashmore Kidd served as speaker for the assembly.

Members elected to the Assembly
Italicized names indicate members returned by acclamation.

Timeline

External links 
Members in Parliament 18

References 

Terms of the Legislative Assembly of Ontario
1929 establishments in Ontario
1934 disestablishments in Ontario